Ezra Stiles may refer to:

Ezra Stiles (1727–95), American academic and educator
Ezra C. Stiles (1891-1974), American landscape architect 
Ezra Stiles College, residential college at Yale University

See also
Ezra Stiles Gannett (1801-1871), American Unitarian minister